Coraciimorphae is a clade of birds that contains the order Coliiformes (mousebirds) and the clade Cavitaves (a large assemblage of birds that includes woodpeckers, kingfishers and trogons). The name however was coined in the 1990s by Sibley and Ahlquist based on their  DNA-DNA hybridization studies conducted in the late 1970s and throughout the 1980s. However their Coraciimorphae only contains Trogoniformes and Coraciiformes.

Taxonomy

Cladogram of Coraciimorphae relationships based on Jarvis, E.D. et al. (2014) with some clade names after  Yuri, T. et al. (2013).

References

Neognathae